Spain hurricane may refer to:

 1842 Spain hurricane
 Hurricane Vince (2005)
 Hurricane Gordon (2006)